Usue Maitane Arconada was the defending champion but chose not to participate.

Madison Brengle won the title, defeating Yuan Yue in the final, 6–7(3–7), 6–3, 6–2.

Seeds

Draw

Finals

Top half

Bottom half

References

External Links
Main Draw

Berkeley Tennis Club Challenge - Singles